Maarten Pieter Tjallingii (born 5 November 1977) is a Dutch former professional racing cyclist, who rode professionally between 2003 and 2016.

Career
Born in Leeuwarden, Tjallingii's biggest win was the 2006 Tour of Belgium. A frequent participant in breakaways in major races, his other most notable performances include a third place at the 2011 Paris–Roubaix and spending four days in the King of the Mountains jersey in the 2014 Giro d'Italia.

Tjallingii was selected to ride the 2012 Tour de France, but crashed on stage 3, he continued for another  and finished it over ten minutes behind the winner Peter Sagan. However he did not start stage 4, reportedly with a fractured left hip, becoming the third retirement of the 2012 Tour.

Tjallingii raced at the 2016 Giro d'Italia, which started in the Netherlands, and he made an impact on the early stages, winning the award for most aggressive rider on Stage 2 before taking the lead in the King of the Mountains competition on Stage 3, which finished 250 metres away from his home in Arnhem.

Major results

2001
 3rd Overall Tour du Faso
1st Stage 2
2003
 1st Overall Tour du Faso
1st Stage 1
 1st Rund um Rhede
2004
 2nd Cross-country, National Mountain Bike Championships
2005
 5th Overall Tour of Qatar
2006
 1st Overall Tour of Belgium
1st Stage 1
 1st Overall Tour of Qinghai Lake
1st Stage 7
 7th Overall Tour de Picardie
 10th Overall Tour of Britain
2007
 2nd Overall Tour of Belgium
 4th Overall Danmark Rundt
 6th Grote Prijs Gerrie Knetemann
 7th Overall Four Days of Dunkirk
 7th Overall Tour of Britain
 7th Rund um den Henninger Turm
 9th Omloop van het Houtland
 10th Nokere Koerse
 10th Ronde van het Groene Hart
2008
 5th Profronde van Fryslan
 6th Overall Tour of Belgium
 7th Overall Tour of Qatar
2009
 4th Grand Prix d'Isbergues
 5th Overall Sachsen Tour
 8th Overall Eneco Tour
2010
 7th Overall Eneco Tour
2011
 3rd Paris–Roubaix
2013
 1st Stage 2 World Ports Classic
2014
 Giro d'Italia
Held  after Stages 2–5
2015
 1st Grote Prijs Beeckman-De Caluwé
2016
Giro d'Italia
Held  after Stage 3

Grand Tour general classification results timeline

Personal life
During his career, Tjallingii was one of the few known vegetarian cyclists. He lost one of his kidneys as a child.

References

External links

Living people
1977 births
Dutch male cyclists
Sportspeople from Arnhem
UCI Road World Championships cyclists for the Netherlands
Cyclists from Gelderland
20th-century Dutch people
21st-century Dutch people